John Snook may refer to:
 John S. Snook (1862–1952), U.S. Representative from Ohio
 John B. Snook (1815–1901), American architect